The 2016–17 Borussia Dortmund season was the 106th season (and 107th overall year) in the football club's history and 41st consecutive and 50th overall season in the top flight of German football, the Bundesliga, having been promoted from the 2. Bundesliga in 1976.

In addition to the domestic league, Borussia Dortmund also participated in this season's editions of the domestic cup, the DFB-Pokal, and the first-tier continental cup, the UEFA Champions League. This was the 44th season for the club in the Westfalenstadion, located in Dortmund, Germany. The stadium had a capacity of 81,360 for Bundesliga matches, and a capacity of 65,851 for continental matches. The season covered a period from 1 July 2016 to 30 June 2017.

The season was the first since 2006–07 without Mats Hummels, who departed to FC Bayern Munich, though he later returned to Dortmund for the 2019–20 season.

Month by month review

Players

Squad

Transfers

In

Total Spending:  €119.85M

Out

Total Income:  €123M

Total Expenditure:  €3.15M

Friendly matches

International Champions Cup

Competitions

Overview

Bundesliga

League table

Results summary

Results by round

Matches

DFB-Pokal

DFL-Supercup

UEFA Champions League

Group stage

Knockout phase

Round of 16

Quarter-finals

Statistics

Appearances and goals

|-
! colspan=14 style=background:#dcdcdc; text-align:center| Goalkeepers

|-
! colspan=14 style=background:#dcdcdc; text-align:center| Defenders

|-
! colspan=14 style=background:#dcdcdc; text-align:center| Midfielders

|-
! colspan=14 style=background:#dcdcdc; text-align:center| Forwards

|-
! colspan=14 style=background:#dcdcdc; text-align:center| Players transferred out during the season

Goalscorers

Last updated: 27 May 2017

Clean sheets

Last updated: 29 April 2017

Disciplinary record

Last updated: 27 May 2017

References

Borussia Dortmund seasons
Borussia Dortmund
Borussia Dortmund